Community economic analysis is examining how a community is put together economically and how the community responds to external and internal stimuli. Community economic analysis is a comprehensive rationale where people in a community challenge common methodologies within the system in an effort to increase net efficiency. During this process factors affecting the community are analyzed to address economic needs and to pinpoint unfulfilled opportunities. Upon completion of the analysis the group decides what can and should be done to improve the economic conditions within the community, and then move to put the agreed-on economic goals and objectives into action.

See also
Community building
Community development
Community economic development
List of community topics
Social economy

References

External links
 Community Economic Analysis: A How to Manual
 Glen C. Pulver "father of community economics"
 Center for community economic development

Community